Ploshchad Vosstaniya (lit. Uprising Square) is a station on the Kirovsko-Vyborgskaya Line of Saint Petersburg Metro. It is one of the system's original stations, opening on November 15, 1955. It is a deep underground pylon station at  depth. The main surface vestibule is situated on Vosstaniya Square, which gives its name to the station. Another exit (opened in 1960) opens directly into the Moskovsky Rail Terminal. Ploshchad Vosstaniya is connected to the station Mayakovskaya of the Nevsko-Vasileostrovskaya Line via a transfer corridor and a set of escalators.

Gallery

External links

Saint Petersburg Metro stations
Nevsky Prospekt
Railway stations in Russia opened in 1955
Railway stations located underground in Russia
Cultural heritage monuments of regional significance in Saint Petersburg